

Tatul Ashiki Hakobyan (born December 29, 1969) is an Armenian reporter and an independent political analyst.

Early life and education
Hakobyan was born in the village of Dovegh in northeastern Armenia, near the border with Azerbaijan. He attended the Yerevan State University and graduated from the Journalism Department in 1995. He is also a graduate of the Georgian Institute of Public Affairs in Tbilisi.

Career
Hakobyan has formerly worked as a correspondent for the newspapers Ankakhutyun (1991–1995), Yerkir (1998–2000), Azg (2000–2006), Aztag (2005-2016), The Armenian Reporter (2008–2009) and as a political observer on regional issues of Radiolur news program of the Public Radio of Armenia (2004–2008). From 2009 until February 2021 he worked as a reporter and analyst at the independent Civilitas Foundation (CivilNet).

Since 2014 Hakobyan has been the director of the Yerevan-based ANI Foundation for Armenian Studies (Հայկական ուսումնասիրությունների ԱՆԻ հիմնադրամ). He is currently a columnist at Aliq Media.

Personal life
Hakobyan is married with two sons. He speaks Armenian, Russian, English, and Spanish.

Publications
Կանաչ ու սև. արցախյան օրագիր [Green and Black: Karabakh Diary] (2008)
Հայացք Արարատից. հայերը և թուրքերը [View from Ararat: Armenians and Turks] (2012)
Մահվան հովիտ․ 44-օրյա աղետ [Valley of Death: 44-Day Disaster] (2021)

References

Living people
1969 births
Armenian male writers
Armenian journalists
Yerevan State University alumni